Anonymous was a band from Andorra that in 2007 represented the country with the song "Salvem el món" in the Eurovision Song Contest 2007 after being chosen by the internal national selection.  The song, however, failed to make it through past the semi-final stage.

The top ten acts are moved up to the finals, and Andorra came in 12th. The band was formed in 2004 and has had some success in Andorra and northern Spain (mainly Catalonia).

Eurovision Song Contest 2007
The band sang "Salvem el món" for Andorra - however, Narvaez was underage for the contest, so only Francesca, Martínez, and Gallego were able to perform. The band did not move on to the finals, as they came in 12th place with 80 points. However, this is the best result Andorra has ever achieved in the contest.

Nick Gain
Anonymous's lead singer Niki Francesca went on to study a masters in music business & technology and a professional certificate in music production granted by Berklee College of Music and now performs under the name Nick Gain.

Discography

Albums
 Anonymous (Demo)

Singles
 "Salvem El Món (Let's Save The World)" — No. 3 ESP (17th Week) No. 7 ESP (18th Week)

References

External links

Video of song "Salvem el món (Let's save the world)"
Andorra Eurovision Song Contest 2007 page with Anonymous
Band home page

Eurovision Song Contest entrants for Andorra
Eurovision Song Contest entrants of 2007
Catalan-language singers
Pop punk groups
Andorran musical groups
Música Global artists